Azad Academy is a school in Araria, Bihar.

References

Schools in Bihar
Education in Araria
Educational institutions in India with year of establishment missing